Atlético Venezuela is a professional football club, founded and promoted to Venezuelan league in 2009 and 2012, based in Caracas.

Achievements
Segunda División Venezolana: 2
2009–10, 2011–12

Torneo de Clausura Segunda División Venezolana: 2
2009–10, 2011–12

Current squad

Managers
 Walter Roque (2008–09)
 Rodrigo Piñon (2009)
 Jesús Iglesias (2009–10)
 Carlos Ravel (2010–11)
 Edson Rodríguez (2010–11)
 José Hernández (2012–13)
 Manuel Plasencia (2015–)

External links
 Official site

References

Association football clubs established in 2009
Football clubs in Venezuela
Football clubs in Caracas
2009 establishments in Venezuela